

364001–364100 

|-bgcolor=#f2f2f2
| colspan=4 align=center | 
|}

364101–364200 

|-id=166
| 364166 Trebek || 2006 JB || Alex Trebek (1940–2020) was a Canadian-American television personality and game show host, who hosted the game show Jeopardy for over 36 years. He was awarded seven Outstanding Game Show Host Emmy Awards between 1989 and 2020. He also was awarded a star on the Hollywood Walk of Fame in 1999. || 
|-id=192
| 364192 Qianruhu ||  || Qian Ruhu (born 1950) is a veteran amateur astronomer from Shanghai, China. He has written numerous articles on astronomy-related topics since the early 1980s, many of which were published by the magazine Amateur Astronomers. || 
|}

364201–364300 

|-id=264
| 364264 Martymartina ||  || Martina Maestripieri (born 1983) is an active amateur astronomer and member of the Gruppo Astrofili Montagna Pistoiese. She deals with astrometry of minor planets and comets, in particular the follow-up of NEOs. She also contributed to the discovery of the Haumea ring via a stellar occultation. || 
|}

364301–364400 

|-bgcolor=#f2f2f2
| colspan=4 align=center | 
|}

364401–364500 

|-bgcolor=#f2f2f2
| colspan=4 align=center | 
|}

364501–364600 

|-id=566
| 364566 Yurga ||  || Yurga is a town in Kemerovskaya region, in Central Russia, located on the Tom' River, and the birthplace of the discoverer. He dedicates this name to his parents, Nina Pavlovna Rumyantseva (1940–2005) and Vladimir Vasil'evich Rumyantsev (1936–2018). || 
|-id=577
| 364577 Cachopito ||  || Fernando Izquierdo Lacruz "Cachopito" (born 1986) is an audio engineer and a dub artist living in Madrid, Spain. He is the elder nephew of the discoverer || 
|}

364601–364700 

|-id=636
| 364636 Ulrikeecker ||  || Ulrike Ecker (born 1967), wife of Austrian discoverer Hannes Bachleitner || 
|}

364701–364800 

|-bgcolor=#f2f2f2
| colspan=4 align=center | 
|}

364801–364900 

|-id=875
| 364875 Hualookeng ||  || Hua Loo-Keng (1910–1985), an academician of Chinese Academy of Sciences, is hailed as the father of modern mathematics in China. Mathematical accomplishments named after him include Hua's Theorem, the Cartan-Brauer-Hua Theorem, Hua's Inequation, the Weil-Hua Inequation and the Hua-Wang Method. || 
|}

364901–365000 

|-bgcolor=#f2f2f2
| colspan=4 align=center | 
|}

References 

364001-365000